The Multi-Crop Passport Descriptor (MCPD) is an extension to the widely used international standard to facilitate germplasm passport information exchange developed jointly by the International Board for Plant Genetic Resources (now Bioversity International) and the FAO. The MCPD is designed to provide a consistent and comprehensive method for describing and exchanging information about plant genetic resources.

The descriptors are compatible with Bioversity's crop descriptor lists, with the descriptors used by the FAO World Information and Early Warning System (WIEWS) on plant genetic resources (PGR), and the GENESYS global portal.

The MCPD includes a set of descriptors that cover a wide range of information about a plant, such as its scientific name, common names, growth habit, reproductive type, and disease resistance. It also includes descriptors for key morphological and agronomic traits, as well as descriptors for important genetic and cytogenetic characteristics. This allows for a detailed description of the plant and its characteristics, making it easier to identify and distinguish it from other similar plants.

The MCPD also includes information about the origin and distribution of the plant, as well as its current use and potential uses. This information can be used to identify and prioritize germplasm for conservation and utilization.

Overall, the MCPD is an important tool for the conservation and sustainable use of plant genetic resources. It provides a consistent and comprehensive method for describing and exchanging information about these resources, which is essential for their effective management and use.

References

External links 
 https://www.bioversityinternational.org/e-library/publications/detail/descripteurs-de-passeport-multi-cultures-faobioversity-v21/

Crop protection